Tinne Hoff Kjeldsen is a Danish mathematician who works in the Department of Science, Systems and Models (IMFUFA) at Roskilde University, and in the Department of Science Education at the University of Copenhagen. Her research interests include the philosophy of mathematics, history of mathematics, and mathematics education.

Kjeldsen earned her doctorate in 1999 from Roskilde University under the supervision of Anders Hede Madsen. In 2012, she became one of the inaugural fellows of the American Mathematical Society.

References

External links
Home page at Roskilde University

Year of birth missing (living people)
Living people
Danish women mathematicians
20th-century Danish  mathematicians
21st-century Danish  mathematicians
Danish historians of mathematics
Mathematics educators
Philosophers of mathematics
Fellows of the American Mathematical Society
20th-century women mathematicians
21st-century women mathematicians